Chandar Nahan is a high altitude lake which is located in Rohru tehsil of Shimla district in Himachal Pradesh, India at an elevation of about  above sea level. It is surrounded by snow for a long time and is the source of the river Pabbar.

References

External links
Himachal Pradesh Tourism Department
http://shimla.hptours.org/lakes/chandranahan-or-chander-naun-lake

Lakes of Himachal Pradesh
Geography of Shimla district